Oswaldo Baliza (9 October 1923 – 30 September 1999) was a Brazilian footballer. He played in two matches for the Brazil national football team from 1949 to 1952. He was also part of Brazil's squad for the 1949 South American Championship.

References

1923 births
1999 deaths
Brazilian footballers
Brazil international footballers
Place of birth missing
Association football goalkeepers